Vanessa Wruble (born August 27, 1974) is an American entrepreneur, journalist, and activist. In 2017, Wruble co-founded and served as Head of Campaign Operations of the 2017 Women's March and founded March On where she is executive director.

Personal life

Early life and education 
Wruble grew up in Washington, D.C, the daughter of Bernhardt K. Wruble, a prominent lawyer appointed by President Jimmy Carter as the first director of the Office of Government Ethics. She graduated from Sidwell Friends High School, a Quaker school. She earned a BA (cum laude) from Williams College, studying women’s issues, psychology, and fiction writing, and Master's degrees in social research in psychology from The New School and in interactive media from NYU.

Early career 
With the launch of Al Gore's Current TV, Wruble served as the company's first international correspondent. She also worked as a journalist for print magazines and as a communication specialist for the United Nations.

OkayAfrica 
In 2011, together with The Roots frontman Questlove, Wruble founded OkayAfrica, a digital media platform dedicated to African culture, music and politics. She helped the company become the largest US-based website focusing on new and progressive music, art, politics, and culture from the African continent. She ran the company for seven years until she stepped down to organize the 2017 Women's March.

Activism

Women's March 
Wruble co-founded the Women's March on Washington, and served as head of campaign operations. In an effort to bring diversity to the march's leadership, she brought on three of its four national co-chairs, Carmen Perez, Linda Sarsour, and Tamika Mallory, to serve alongside Bob Bland.

The march was originally called the "Millions Women's March". Wruble renamed it "The Women's March on Washington" to avoid overwriting the history of the 1997 Millions Women's March in Philadelphia.

Eventually Wruble, who is Jewish, left the Women's March Movement, citing antisemitic comments by Mallory and Perez and antisemitic sentiment in the movement generally.

March On 
In October 2017, Wruble led the leaders of the decentralized nationwide Women's Marches to form a new organization, March On. In addition, they launched a Super PAC called March On's Fight Back PAC. March On takes a bottom-up approach to coordinate actions at the federal, state, and local level, by joining together the various women's groups around the nation to work together. March On announced the goal of creating political change through its "March On the Polls" campaign, including marching people to voting booths for the November 2018 midterms (a "March On the Midterms"). On January 20, 2018, March On launched a nationwide poll to help design the liberal activist agenda for the 2018 midterms and beyond.

Honors and awards 

 Echoing Green Fellow 1996
 Glamour Women of the Year 2017
 2017 PEN/Toni and James C. Goodale Freedom of Expression Courage Award

References 

1974 births
Living people
American activists
American women journalists
Williams College alumni
Sidwell Friends School alumni
The New School alumni
New York University alumni
Jewish American community activists
Jewish American journalists
Jewish feminists
Women's March
21st-century American Jews
21st-century American women